Two Women is a 1940 French film directed by Léonide Moguy.

It was known as L'empreinte du Dieu.

It was one of the last French films made before the German occupation. The New York Times called it a "flimsy and dismal affair".

Cast
Pierre Blanchar
Annie Ducaux
Blanchette Brunoy

References

External links

Film page at Uni France

1940 films
Films directed by Léonide Moguy
French drama films
1940s French-language films
1940 drama films
French black-and-white films
1940s French films